Niccolò Taddia (born 13 May 1999) is an Italian rugby union player, currently playing for Top12 side Fiamme Oro. He is also a permit player for the Pro14 side Zebre. His preferred position is hooker.

Zebre
Taddia was announced as a permit player for Zebre for Round 15 of the 2020–21 Pro14 match against . He made his debut in the same match, scoring a try.

References

External links
itsrugby.co.uk Profile

1999 births
Living people
Italian rugby union players
Zebre Parma players
Rugby union hookers